Stefan Rudan (born January 9, 1990) is a Serbian footballer who plays as a defender.

Playing career
Rudan signed with FK Bežanija in 2008, but shortly after was transferred to OFK Žarkovo in the Belgrade Zone League. In 2010 he played in the Serbian League Vojvodina with OFK Bačka, and later in the Serbian League Belgrade with FK Voždovac, FK Jedinstvo Ub, and FK Sopot. In 2012, he spend time in the Belgrade Zone League, and Serbian League Vojvodina with FK Palilulac Beograd, FK Senta, and with FK Đerdap in 2013.

In 2014, he played abroad in the Macedonian First Football League with FK Sileks. The following season played in the Armenian Premier League with FC Shirak. In 2016, he played in the Serbian First League with OFK Beograd, where he appeared in five matches. In 2017, was transferred to FK Bratstvo Prigrevica in the Serbian League Vojvodina. In 2018, he made his third stint abroad in the Canadian Soccer League with Scarborough SC.

References

1990 births
Living people
Serbian footballers
FK Sileks players
OFK Beograd players
Scarborough SC players
Macedonian First Football League players
Serbian First League players
Canadian Soccer League (1998–present) players
Armenian Premier League players
OFK Žarkovo players
OFK Bačka players
FK Jedinstvo Ub players
FK Sopot players
FK Palilulac Beograd players
FK Senta players
FC Shirak players
Association football defenders
Serbian League players